Troy Titus-Adams  (born Troy Johanna D. Adams, October 1969) is a British actress and dancer. She began her career touring as a dancer and made her feature film debut in Knights and Emeralds (1986). She is known for her roles in the soap operas EastEnders (1999–2000) as Nina Harris  and Family Affairs (2000) as Kim Davis. She also appeared on the game show Blankety Blank (2001).

Early life
Titus-Adams is from Islington, North London. She was born to Jamaican father Joe Titus, a builder, and English mother Maggie Adams, a secretary at a London hospice. Her parents split when she was six, and she spent four years until she was ten in Amsterdam. Titus-Adams attended George Orwell Comprehensive School and took after-school acting classes at the Italia Conti Academy of Theatre Arts. She also modeled.

Filmography

Stage

References

External links 

 
 Website

Living people
Black British actresses
English people of Jamaican descent
English soap opera actresses
People from the London Borough of Islington
Year of birth missing (living people)